Mimacronia is a genus of longhorn beetles of the subfamily Lamiinae, containing the following species:

 Mimacronia alboplagiata (Schultze, 1922)
 Mimacronia arnaudi (Hüdepohl, 1983)
 Mimacronia decimaculata (Schultze, 1919)
 Mimacronia dinagatensis (Hüdepohl, 1995)
 Mimacronia novemmaculata (Hüdepohl, 1995)
 Mimacronia viridimaculatoides (Breuning, 1980)
 Mimacronia regale Barševskis, 2015
 Mimacronia viridimaculata (Breuning, 1947)

References

Pteropliini